Geoffrey Cridge (born 6 February 1995) is a New Zealand rugby union player, who currently plays as a lock or loose forward for  in the French Top 14 competition.

Early career

Born and raised in the city of Christchurch, Cridge was educated at the prestigious Christchurch Boys' High School where he played first XV rugby for 2 years. During his high school years, he also represented  at under-15, under-16 and under-18 level before heading north to  after graduation to start playing club rugby for Hastings.

Senior career

After initially being a member of the  development and under-20 sides, Cridge graduated to the senior team to make one appearance during the 2014 ITM Cup. Injury ruled him out of the Magpies promotion winning season of 2015, but he bounced back in 2016 to claim a place as a regular in the starting XV. Helped out by an injury to established lock Michael Allardice, Cridge stepped up to partner Hurricanes team-mate Mark Abbott in the Magpies second row. He played all 10 of Hawke's Bay's games during the 2016 season and contributed 2 tries.

During the following seasons, Cridge cemented himself in the Magpies' starting line-up. During the 2020 Mitre 10 Cup season, the Magpies won the Ranfurly Shield (taking it off ), were successful in three more Ranfurly Shield defences (against ,  and ), and won the Mitre 10 Cup Championship, thus securing a well-deserved promotion to the Premiership division. The Magpies held on to the Shield during the entire 2021 Bunnings NPC season, winning all six Ranfurly Shield defences.

Super Rugby

Cridge spent time with the Wellington-based  as part of their apprenticeship program in 2014 and made such a good impression that after only 1 domestic appearance for Hawke's Bay, new franchise head-coach Chris Boyd handed him a 3-year contract ahead of the 2015 Super Rugby season. Unsurprisingly, given his lack of experience and the amount of talent on the Hurricanes books, he didn't make any senior appearances through 2015.

He did manage to get on the field for his Super Rugby debut in 2016, as a substitute in a 42–20 win over South African side  on 25 March 2016.

While not announced in their original squad, he was announced as a reinforcement of the  squad for the 2022 Super Rugby Pacific season on 21 January 2022. He made his debut for the Waratahs on 18 February 2022 in their round 1 game against Fijian Drua.

Move to France

On 22 June 2022, it was announced that Cridge had signed with 2021–22 Pro D2 champions  for two seasons. He made his Top 14 debut for the French club on 1 October 2022 against  and played his first EPCR Challenge Cup game for the side on 11 December 2022 against Scarlets.

International career

Cridge was a member of the New Zealand Under-20 sides that competed in the 2014 IRB Junior World Championship in his home country and the 2015 World Rugby Under 20 Championship in Italy. He played four times as New Zealand finished 3rd in 2014 and then scored a try in his only appearance in the title-winning side of 2015.

Career Honours

New Zealand Under-20

World Rugby Under 20 Championship - 2015

Hurricanes

Super Rugby - 2016

Hawke's Bay Magpies

ITM Cup Championship - 2015
Mitre 10 Cup Championship - 2020

Super Rugby Statistics

References

External links
itsrugby.co.uk profile

1995 births
Living people
People educated at Christchurch Boys' High School
New Zealand rugby union players
Rugby union players from Christchurch
Rugby union locks
Hawke's Bay rugby union players
Hurricanes (rugby union) players
New South Wales Waratahs players
Aviron Bayonnais players